Mokalsar is a village in Siwana tehsil of Barmer district in Indian state of Rajasthan, located on RJ SH 38.

References

 Mokalsar Geographical Details
 Mokalsar Population

Mokalsar a village, Having bunch of natural flavours. One of the beautiful village of "Marwad" region in rajasthan.
"Chappan ki pahadiya" The Continues 56 hills is one of the huge part offamous "Aravali Parvatmala". The top most hill among these 56 hills is here, Mokalsar.
Population of Mokalsar is about 8027. Majority is of Hindu's (Brahmin, Rajput, Jainism, Bhati). 
it is about 120 km away from Barmer, district of mokalsar and 45 km away from jalor district. Nearer cities are Balotra,
Majal City and jalor.

Villages in Barmer district